Juncus subsecundus , the fingered rush, is a species of rush found in many parts of Australia.

References

subsecundus
Flora of Australia
Plants described in 1957